Vijayakrishnan was born in 1952 in Thiruvananthapuram, Kerala.  He is a well-known film critic as well as a film director who also writes stories and movie reviews.  Vijayakrishnan has received eight State Awards, one National Award, and two Critics Awards, among many others.  Vijayakrishnan is a well known film historian in India.

Vijayakrishnan was a member of the Kerala State Film Award Committee and National Award Committee on multiple occasions. He was also a member of the Indian Panorama Selection Committee for Filmotsav 1986. Vijayakrishna 
served as a member of the Indian Central Board for Film Certification for 8 years, Bharatiya Vidya Bhavan, and former Director Board Member of Kerala State Film Development Corporation. He was also a member of the Board of Studies in Thunchath Ezhuthachan Malayalam University. Presently, he is the Chairman of Padmarajan Trust.

Awards

Books
Fiction:-

 Saarthavahakasanghom
 Anuyay
 Brahmapurathekkulla vandi
 Mruthyuvinte mukham
 Thamasinte kannukal
 Padayottom
 Naalamathe salabanjika
 Chirukantanum yakshirmarum
 Nidhi
 Shakespearum meenkariyum
 Vijayakrishnante laghunovelukal
 Kizhavanmarthandante Kuthira
 Samayaratham
 Paloramathayude Pasu

On film:-

 Kaalathil kothiya silpangal
 Nerinu nere pidicha kannadi
 Malayala cinemayude katha
 Karuppum veluppum varnangalum
 Marunna prathichhayakal
 Chalachitrasameeksha
 Chalachitrathinte porul
 Lokacinema
 Satyajit rayyude lokam
 Malayala cinema
 Chalachitravum yatharthyavum
 Viswothara thirakkathakal
 Malayala cinemayile madhavam
 Malayala cinemayile mathru sannidhyam
 Vathilppurakkazhchakal
 Marakkanavatha malayala cinemakal
 Chitrasala
 Thirakkathayum Cinemayum
 Luis Buñuel
 Indian Cinemayude 100 Varshangal
 Hollywood muthal Kim-ki-duk vare
 Indian Cinema : 101 varshangal 101 Chitrangal
 Rajyabhrashtanaya Marthanda Varma

Literary criticism:-
 Iruttil urangathirikkunna oral

Children's literature:-
 Kamandalu
 Boothathan kunnu

Filmography

See also 
 List of Indian writers

References

External links 
 
 
 
 
 
 http://vijayakrishnan.com/

Film directors from Thiruvananthapuram
Malayalam novelists
1952 births
Living people
Malayalam film directors
Indian film critics
Malayalam screenwriters
Kerala State Film Award winners
Screenwriters from Thiruvananthapuram
Indian male screenwriters
20th-century Indian film directors
21st-century Indian film directors